Veľký Kamenec is a village and municipality in the Trebišov District in the Košice Region of south-eastern Slovakia.

History
In historical records the village was first mentioned in 1280.

Geography
The village lies at an altitude of 124 metres and covers an area of 12.723 km².
It has a population of about 835 people.

Ethnicity
The village is about 89% Hungarian 10% Slovak and 1% Gypsy, Czech and Ukrainian.

Facilities
The village has a public library and a football pitch

External links
https://web.archive.org/web/20070513023228/http://www.statistics.sk/mosmis/eng/run.html

Villages and municipalities in Trebišov District